Shahandasht Waterfall, is a waterfall in Amol, Iran, and is near Shahan Dasht village 65 kilometers from Amol, next to the Haraz Road from Amol to Tehran.
The height of Shahandasht waterfall is about 180 meters. It is the second-highest waterfall in Iran, and the most interesting thing about this waterfall is that water never stops falling from it, even during the cold and breezy winter. If you are planning to have a visit of Shahandasht Waterfall, it is good to know that there is the magnificent Malek Bahman Fort just nearby it.

Sources
 Iran Traveller Magazine - Waterfall, Page 21, printed issue:  12433

References

External Links 

Waterfalls of Iran
Tourist attractions in Amol
Tourist attractions in Mazandaran Province